Pseudometabletus nevermanni is a species of beetle in the family Carabidae, the only species in the genus Pseudometabletus.

References

Ctenodactylinae